Damian D. Pitts (January 21, 1969) also known as 'Skipper' Pitts, is a U.S. Marine turned business owner. Previously served as the practice chair of organizational development and design at N2Growth, a global leadership development consultancy serving Board and C-level executives and other senior leaders by helping them create a culture of leadership. Currently, Skipper is the Founder/CEO at FlexRight Solutions, a consulting and technology integration organization for business, government, and law enforcement agencies. Training and consulting in strategic execution, business education and technology integration for small unmanned aircraft systems—this is what FlexRight Solutions™ is all about! Pitts is also the author of the Crisis Leadership and Performance Driven Execution framework that is used by leaders across industry to avoid risk while leading out from crises before they occur.

Pitts holds a Ph.D. from Wake Forest College in Organizational Behavior Studies, a bachelor's degree from the University of South Carolina, and is an instructor of executive education at Temple University, in Philadelphia, Pennsylvania.

Background

Damian D. “Skipper” Pitts, was raised in Philadelphia, Pennsylvania, where he played little league football in the Police Athletic League and on throughout high school. He enlisted in the United States Marine Corps and left the day of his high school graduation for Bootcamp at Parris Island, SC. Pitts is  now a  retired U.S. Marine Corps Officer (served on six battlefields including a tour in special operations) currently serving as Chair of the Organizational Development Practice and is a member of the N2Growth Team with Brian Layer  CEO, Brigadier General, (retired), John Baldoni, Mike Myatt, John Childress, Patricia H. Lenkov, Joel Garfinkle, Jitendra Singh, and Grant Wattie.  In 2013 Pitts founded the Leadership Bar Initiative™,  a thought–leadership training and professional development endeavor. He also operates an active coaching practice advising senior executives.

Pitts was appointed as the military advisor for the Screen Gems Studios film Stateside and was responsible for training the cast including Val Kilmer and Johnathan Tucker, where he was also asked to play Kilmer’s on‐screen drill instructor.

Viewpoints
Pitts believes that process transformation (operations and process-led transformation to drive high performance-driven execution tactics.) is the pre‐requisite to being not just great, but inspiring extraordinary growth to experiencing new possibilities through change.

Business Ventures

In 2004 Pitts formed The Bison Group to use military-style executive education and consulting to build congruence between leadership, strategy and execution. Pitts consulted with business executives at Fortune 100/500 companies across the United States and Canada.

He is the author of eight books, more than 50 journals and publications and is a featured writer on Leadership topics at Fast Company and Blogger (the Leadership Bar and N2Growth)

In 2013 Pitts founded the Leadership Bar Initiative, a thought leadership training and professional development endeavor.

In 2009 Pitts and his wife started a small business known as Success Natural Cosmetics, Inc., that manufactures bath and body care products and all natural candles. In

2014 · Pitts developed the game Scandalytes- the Crisis Leadership Game for the consumer markets based on the TV drama "Scandal." The website for the game is https://web.archive.org/web/20170604015104/http://scandalytes-thegame.com/.  He also added a business game called Moment of Truth (available at www.n2growth.com) that teaches crisis leadership tactics and strategies for leaders and organizations to avoid risk and lead out from crises before they happen.

Bibliography

Successfirmations:Think, Reveal, Receive: Leadership Formula for Success, Damian D. "Skipper" Pitts, 
 Success TRAPS: Awaken your Realized Potential for Lasting Fulfillment. Damian D."Skipper" Pitts 
 Success TRAPS Concepts Guide, by Damian D. "Skipper" Pitts

Speaking
Pitts is a sought after Keynote Speaker who enjoys speaking to youth on leadership.

C# Corner Annual Conference 2014

National Precast Concrete Association, NPCA 49th Annual Convention

2014 National Scholastics POP Warner Conference, Eastern Region Meeting, Woodcliff Lake Hilton, Woodcliff, NJ.

References

1969 births
Living people